Michel Kettenmeyer (born 7 February 1989) is a Luxembourgian international footballer who plays as a defensive midfielder for UN Käerjéng 97.

Career
Kettenmeyer has played for FC Differdange 03, FC UNA Strassen, Union Titus Pétange, FC Lorentzweiler and UN Käerjéng 97.

He earned 2 international caps for Luxembourg in 2010.

References

1989 births
Living people
Luxembourgian footballers
Luxembourg international footballers
FC Differdange 03 players
FC UNA Strassen players
Union Titus Pétange players
FC Lorentzweiler players
UN Käerjéng 97 players
Luxembourg National Division players
Association football midfielders